During the Spanish–American War, the United States Army, United States Marine Corps, and United States Navy fought 30 significant battles against the Spanish Army and Spanish Navy. Of these, 27 occurred in the Caribbean theater and three in the Pacific theater. The Caribbean theater consisted of two campaigns — the Puerto Rico campaign, which had ten battles, and the Cuba campaign, with 17 battles — while the Pacific theater had one campaign — the Philippine campaign, with two battles — and the capture of Guam.

Overview

The United States Navy battleship  was mysteriously sunk in Havana harbor on 15 February 1898; political pressures from the Democratic Party pushed the administration of Republican President William McKinley into a war that he had wished to avoid. Spain promised multiple times that it would reform the government of Cuba, but never delivered. The United States sent an ultimatum to Spain demanding that it surrender control of Cuba on 20 April. After the ultimatum was sent, Madrid declared war on 23 April and Washington responded with its own declaration two days later.

The main issue was Cuban independence; the ten-week war was fought in both the Caribbean and the Pacific. After the declaration of war, the U.S. Navy blockaded ports such as Havana and Cardenas. The Spanish attempted to lift the blockades on Cardenas and Matanzas, finally succeeding after failing once at Cardenas. Commodore Dewey successfully destroyed the Spanish Pacific Fleet in Manila Bay on May 1, but failed to land troops. The Navy also blockaded Puerto Rico and bombarded San Juan, but the Spanish attempted to lift this blockade, succeeding on the second attempt in June. The U.S. Marines also cut telegraph lines under the bay of Cienfuegos, but suffered heavy losses from Spanish fire. The U.S. also captured the port of Guantánamo Bay after a four-day battle, which ended on June 10.

U.S. expeditionary forces landed in Cuba on 22 June and skirmished successfully at Las Guasimas two days later. Meanwhile, the island of Guam was "captured" by the Americans, which consisted of raising of the American flag. The U.S. also attempted to land forces near Trinidad, but were repulsed by Spanish forces. The U.S. forces captured San Juan Heights, which overlooked Santiago de Cuba, after two battles at San Juan Hill and Kettle Hill, which was preceded by a smaller battle on the San Juan Hill's right flank at El Caney. The Spanish also attempted to lift the blockade on the port of Manzanillo twice, but failed both times. The Spanish fleet also attempted to escape Santiago harbor, but was destroyed by U.S. gunboats and armored cruisers. After this victory, U.S. forces laid siege to Santiago de Cuba for 14 days, until the Spanish forces surrendered, but there were several skirmishes afterwards. The Spanish managed to cut the United States blockade at Manzanillo, but the Americans sunk two Spanish ships at Nipe Bay. The Americans also tried to land at Mani-Mani, which was west of Havana, but were repulsed by the Spanish.

On 23 July, Americans landed close to the port of Ponce, Puerto Rico. Two days later, there was a small skirmish at Yauco, which was won by the Americans. The Spanish retreated and attempted to destroy rail lines to Ponce, but failed to. On 5 August, American forces marched into the town of Guayama, but the Spanish deserted the town several hours earlier. From 8 to 9 August, an American battalion captured the mountain at Coamo, Puerto Rico, on the road to the port of Ponce. At the same time, there was an inconclusive battle at Fajardo, which led to the capture and desertion of a lighthouse. One day later, the Americans captured Silva Heights. The Americans also landed near Mayaguez, and captured the town with no resistance. At the Battle of Asomante, the US forces took Asomante and captured many Spanish prisoners. At the same time, American forces also captured Manila. These two battles led to an armistice agreement, which quickly led to the Treaty of Paris, which ended the Spanish–American War.

The 1898 Treaty of Paris, which was the result of the American victory in the war, was negotiated on terms favorable to the U.S. which allowed it temporary direct control of Cuba and ceded ownership of Puerto Rico, Guam and the Philippine islands. The cession of the Philippines involved payment of $20 million ($ today) to Spain in order to cover the Spanish infrastructure. The U.S. installed a military government in Cuba immediately after the Treaty of Paris, and eventually let it become an independent republic in 1902. The Philippines also rebelled against U.S. control, which led to the Philippine–American War lasting from 1899 to 1902. The Spanish also sold the rest of their Pacific islands to Germany under the German–Spanish Treaty.

Pacific Theater

Philippine campaign

Capture of Guam

Caribbean Theater

Cuba campaign

Puerto Rico campaign

References

Notes

Citations

Bibliography

External links
 Spanamwar.com: Spanish–American War Centennial website

Conflicts in 1898
Spanish-American War
1898 in Cuba
1898 in Puerto Rico
1898 in the Philippines
1898 in the Spanish Empire
1898 in the Spanish East Indies
1898 in Guam
1898 in the Spanish West Indies
1898 in the United States